The eared quetzal (Euptilotis neoxenus), also known as the eared trogon, is a near passerine bird in the trogon  family, Trogonidae. It is native to streamside pine-oak forests and canyons in the Sierra Madre Occidental of Mexico south to western Michoacán and southeasternmost Arizona in the United States.  This range includes part of the Madrean Sky Islands region of southeastern Arizona, southwestern New Mexico, and northern Sonora.

Taxonomy
The eared quetzal was described and illustrated in 1838 by the English ornithologist and bird artist John Gould in his book A Monograph of the Trogonidae, or Family of Trogons based on a specimen collected in Mexico.  He coined the binomial name Trogon neoxenus. In 1858, in the second edition of his book, Gould placed the species in its own genus Euptilotis to give the current binomial name Euptilotis neoxenus. The eared quetzal is the only species placed in the genus. The specific epithet combines the Ancient Greek  meaning "new" with  meaning "stranger", "guest" or "visitor". The genus name Euptilotis combines the Ancient Greek  meaning "good" with  meaning "feather" and  meaning "-eared".  The species is monotypic: no subspecies are recognised.

A molecular phylogenetic study published in 2005 found that the eared quetzal was sister to a clade containing members of the genus Pharomachrus.

Description
Both sexes have iridescent green backs, iridescent dark blue central tail feathers, and outer tail feathers that are predominantly white terminally with a band of black at the base (sometimes partially barred black and white in females). The bill is dull gray with a slightly darker band at the tip. The adult male has a blackish head, iridescent green breast, and geranium red belly and undertail coverts. The adult female has a gray head, breast, and upper belly and less extensive (though equally bright) red on the lower belly. Both sexes bear the wispy hair-like auricular plumes that give the species its name, though these are rarely apparent in the field. Both head and bill appear rather small and narrow in comparison to those of typical trogons.

The male's song (tremolo call) is a series of whistled notes increasing in volume.  Calls include low-intensity squeals rising in pitch, a loud squeal ending with a sharp "chuck", and a strident cackle given mostly in flight.

Quetzals differ from typical New World trogons in having iridescent wing coverts, less extensive fusion between the two forward-facing toes of their heterodactyl foot, broad tails with distinctly convex (rather than straight or concave) sides, and eggs with pale blue shells.  They also average larger in body size than typical trogons, and the eggs and young develop more slowly. The eared quetzal is a seemingly primitive form, lacking the impressively long iridescent upper tail and wing coverts of members of the genus Pharomachrus (including the resplendent quetzal).

Distribution and habitat
It is a resident of the middle to upper levels of pine-oak woodlands and oak-conifer forests, frequently along streams.

Behaviour and ecology

Breeding
Nests have been observed in pine, fir, maple, and aspen trees. Limited excavation of the cavity is accomplished using the bill to dig into the rotten wood of the walls and opening.

Food and feeding
Eared quetzals feed on insects, small vertebrates, and fruit, including the warty red fruits of madrone trees.  Caterpillars, moths, katydids, cicadas, small lizards, and other prey are fed to the young. Like other trogons, eared quetzals often pluck prey and fruit while hovering.

Members of this species have been observed to exhibit aversion to large areas of conspicuous color on and near human observers (negative chromotropic responses), including white, red, orange, and blue. This suggests that the species-confidence hypothesis, which states that birds tend to be attracted to colors that match those found in their species and repelled by colors not found in their species, does not apply to eared quetzals.

References

Further reading

External links 
 Xeno-canto: audio recordings of the eared quetzal
 BirdLife Species Factsheet
 Eared quetzal photo VIREO Photo-High Res
 Photo Album: Thick-billed parrots and eared quetzals in Madera, Chihuahua

eared quetzal
Endemic birds of Southwestern North America
Native birds of the Southwestern United States
Birds of Mexico
Birds of the Sierra Madre Occidental
Birds of the Trans-Mexican Volcanic Belt
eared quetzal
Taxa named by John Gould